The World's Largest Lobster is a concrete and reinforced steel statue in Shediac, New Brunswick, Canada sculpted by Canadian artist Winston Bronnum. The statue is 11 metres long and 5 metres tall, weighing 90 tonnes. The sculpture was commissioned by the Shediac Rotary Club as a tribute to the town's lobster fishing industry The sculpture took three years to complete, at a cost of $170,000. It attracts 500,000 visitors per year. Contrary to popular belief, this is not actually the "World's Largest Lobster" as that title went to the Big Lobster statue in Kingston, South Australia, until 2015 when Qianjiang, Hubei, China built a 100-tonne lobster/crayfish.

See also
List of world's largest roadside attractions

References

1990 sculptures
Crustaceans in art
Buildings and structures in Westmorland County, New Brunswick
True lobsters
Outdoor sculptures in Canada
Roadside attractions in Canada
Shediac
Steel sculptures in Canada
1990 establishments in New Brunswick